Vladimir Khazrailovich Eshtrekov (born 16 May 1947) is a Russian football manager and former Soviet international player. He played 163 games in the USSR championships and scored 17 goals.

Honours
 Soviet Cup winner: 1970

As a head coach 
 Russian Premier League bronze: 2005

International career
Eshtrekov made his debut for USSR on 17 February 1971 in a friendly against Mexico.

External links
 Profile 

1947 births
Living people
Sportspeople from Nalchik
Soviet footballers
Soviet Union international footballers
Russian footballers
FC Dynamo Moscow players
FC Lokomotiv Moscow players
FC Spartak Moscow players
Soviet Top League players
PFC Spartak Nalchik players
PFC Spartak Nalchik managers
FC Lokomotiv Moscow managers
Russian Premier League managers
Expatriate football managers in Algeria
FC Dinamo Minsk players
Association football forwards
FC Dynamo Vologda players
Russian football managers
Soviet football managers
Soviet expatriate football managers
Soviet expatriate sportspeople in Algeria